Matthew Harper Jones (born August 28, 1978) is an American attorney, businessman, radio host, author, professional wrestling investor, leader of the Williamsport Four, and the owner and founder of Kentucky Sports Radio in Lexington, Kentucky.

Early life and education
Jones was born in Lexington and raised in Middlesboro, Kentucky; his mother practiced law in nearby Pineville, serving as the Commonwealth Attorney for Bell County. Jones attended Transylvania University on a full scholarship before receiving a scholarship to Duke Law School, where he graduated second in his class. After graduation from Duke, Jones returned to Lexington to practice law and began Kentucky Sports Radio.

Career
After graduating from Duke Law School, Jones returned to Kentucky to practice law before founding Kentucky Sports Radio (colloquially known by its initials "KSR"), a website and radio show dedicated to sports coverage involving the University of Kentucky Wildcats, in 2005. Jones bounced around several smaller radio shows before then launching KSR as a radio show in 2010. The radio show's flagship stations are WKJK in Louisville and WLAP in Lexington and is syndicated to 50 radio stations in 37 markets in Kentucky and surrounding states. From September 2016 until July 2019, Jones also hosted "Hey Kentucky!", a nightly sports and news recap program on WLEX-TV in Lexington, since also syndicated to WBNA in Louisville. On "Hey Kentucky!", Jones was joined nightly by rotating co-hosts, with some overlap with the KSR radio show. Jones and KSR also oversee a small network of podcasts based on the KSR brand and featuring personalities from both the KSR website and radio show.

Since founding Kentucky Sports Radio, Jones has used his media platform to discuss both sports and politics. In 2014, he hosted live one-on-one conversations with both incumbent then-Senate Minority Leader Sen. Mitch McConnell and his challenger Kentucky Secretary of State Alison Lundergan Grimes. The conversation with Grimes on September 25 lasted 20 minutes and was called by The Daily Beast as "perhaps her most substantive interview." Unlike Grimes, whose interview was in-studio, McConnell's interview was a spur-of-the-moment, unannounced phone call to the program two weeks later that was described as "emotional and combative." 

The next year, Jones hosted a Republican gubernatorial primary debate between the four candidates vying to win the Republican nomination for Kentucky Governor. Jones has stated that he thinks this debate, three weeks before the primary election, contributed to Matt Bevin's 86-vote primary victory. Jones was also selected as the emcee for the annual Fancy Farm political picnic, the traditional start to Kentucky's fall campaign season, in August 2015. 

These forays into politics have led many to speculate that Jones might one day run for office. He was courted by the Democratic Congressional Campaign Committee to run for the 6th district U.S. House seat occupied by Representative Andy Barr in 2016 but ultimately declined to run. Jones had gone so far as to attend a "boot camp" for potential Democratic candidates in Washington, D.C. during the lead-in to the House race, but the experience left him disillusioned with the national Democratic Party. In a 2018 interview for Politico Magazine, he recalled one prominent member of Congress telling the attendees that positions on issues were far less important than campaign fundraising; Jones would call this "one of the most depressing things [he'd] ever heard."

He had also considered running for the U.S. Senate seat held by McConnell in 2020, but announced on November 15, 2019 that he would not enter the race. This public flirtation with the 2020 U.S. Senate race caused WLEX to permanently remove him from his role as host of "Hey Kentucky!”. On August 15, Jones announced that he had been approached to write a book and had accepted. The book, tentatively titled Mitch, Please!, would take him around all of Kentucky's 120 counties in order to make his case that Sen. McConnell had failed the citizens of Kentucky. In response, the next day, Jones announced that WLEX had permanently ended his run as host of "Hey Kentucky!"

The aforementioned Politico story added,

While Jones identifies as a progressive, Politico has said that he "espouses a doctrine of empathy that you won’t hear from many liberals today." Jones has said "I wish the people that I love didn’t like Donald Trump, but I understand why they do," and claims to regularly talk to more conservatives than any other progressive in the U.S., estimating that 80% of his listeners voted for Trump in 2016. Jones' criticism of Kentucky political figures is not limited to Republicans; he has publicly labeled the state's Democratic Party as "a disaster". At a Democratic banquet held the night before the 2016 Fancy Farm picnic, he blasted the party for abandoning working-class voters, focusing on liberal strongholds in Louisville and Lexington, and compromising on core values to appeal to conservatives.

In addition to the radio show, website, and televised program, Jones also started a sports bar in Lexington that is modeled after the KSR brand called Kentucky Sports Bar & Grille, colloquially known as "KSBar".

On January 5, 2021, Jones and Craig Greenberg, former CEO of 21c Museum Hotels, were announced as lead investors in a group that purchased a majority stake in Ohio Valley Wrestling, a Louisville-based independent professional wrestling promotion. Under the agreement, wrestling veteran Al Snow continues to run OVW's day-to-day operations.

References

External links
 Kentucky Sports Radio official website

1978 births
Duke University School of Law alumni
Kentucky Democrats
Kentucky lawyers
Living people
Ohio Valley Wrestling
People from Middlesboro, Kentucky
Professional wrestling executives
Radio personalities from Kentucky
Transylvania University alumni